Anastassia Khozissova (b. 15 April 1979) is a Russian fashion model.

Career
Khozissova  entered the modeling world at the of 18 after graduating from high school. She was first noticed at the Giorgio Armani runway show in Milan, Italy in the Fall Collection of 1999, and was then shot (by Steven Meisel) for the cover of September Italian Vogue in 1999.

Khozissova has done shows for Chanel, Prada, Dior, Chado Ralph Rucci, Alexander McQueen, Dolce & Gabbana, Roberto Cavalli, Louis Vuitton, Marc Jacobs, Lanvin, Donna Karan, Balenciaga, Miu Miu, Donna Karan, Lagerfeld Gallery, Vivienne Westwood, Roberto Cavalli, Ferre, and Ralph Lauren. She has also been the face of Valentino, Chanel, Dior, Karl Lagerfeld, Vivienne Westwood, Ferre and Ralph Lauren.

In 2004, Ralph Lauren approached Khozissova to be one of their main models. She walked in every show since she started working with them. She has also appeared in Ralph Lauren campaigns and editorial shoots. On October 14, 2010, Khozissova was invited to attend the Ralph Lauren Receives Key to the City of New York ceremony.

Khozissova trained younger girls to properly carry themselves on the runway. Khozissova set up a school (with the help of her agency) where she started to teach models. Her classes have been turned into a multi-part online video called Maybelline Stiletto Boot Camp on Modelinia. Khozissova together with Alina Cho appeared in American Morning on CNN in a segment about walking in heels.

References

External links
 
 

1979 births
Russian female models
People from Saratov
Living people